Marcel Granollers was the defending champion, but lost in the quarterfinals to Dominic Thiem.
David Goffin won the title, defeating Thiem in the final, 4–6, 6–1, 6–3.

Seeds
The top four seeds receive a bye into the second round.

Draw

Finals

Top half

Bottom half

Qualifying

Seeds

Qualifiers

Qualifying draw

First qualifier

Second qualifier

Third qualifier

Fourth qualifier

References
 Main Draw
 Qualifying Draw

Bet-at-Home Cup - Singles
2014 Singles